Astronidium inflatum is a species of plant in the family Melastomataceae. It is endemic to Fiji.

References

Endemic flora of Fiji
inflatum
Critically endangered plants
Taxonomy articles created by Polbot